Rebekah Sophie Elmaloglou (born 23 January 1974) is an Australian actress, known for her roles as teenage tearaway Sophie Simpson on Home and Away and Terese Willis on Neighbours. She also made guest appearances in E Street, A Country Practice and Pacific Drive. Her film appearances include Mad Max Beyond Thunderdome (1985), Princess Kate (1988) and The Sum of Us (1994). Two of her brothers, Dominic and Sebastian Elmaloglou, have also appeared on Home and Away.

Life
Elmaloglou was born at the Royal Women's Hospital, Paddington, New South Wales, to a Greek father, Gregory, who was principal cello in the Sydney Symphony Orchestra, and an English mother, Theresa, who was a kindergarten teacher. Her father was born in France. Elmaloglou left school at the age of 15 and trained at the Keane Kids studios in Sydney, where she studied acting, singing and dancing. Dame Judi Dench is a cousin. She has a brother who is a crew member on Home and Away.

When working on Home and Away (from 1990 to 1993), she frequently had panic attacks. She was later diagnosed with obsessive–compulsive disorder and has been open about her condition.

Elmaloglou has one child with her husband, Kane Baker. Their son, Kai, was born in 2008. She married Baker in 2009.

Career

Elmaloglou has appeared in numerous roles in various programmes and films such as Mad Max Beyond Thunderdome (1985), Five Times Dizzy (1986), Jocelyn Moorhouse' debut film The Siege of Barton's Bathroom (1986), Relatives, Mack the Knife and Limbo plus the 1988 telemovie Princess Kate. In 1989, she had a 2-week guest stint as asthmatic street-kid Simone in E Street and immediately followed this, from 1990 until 1993, with a regular role in Home and Away as Sophie Simpson. Since this show, Elmaloglou has appeared in the Australian film The Sum of Us (1994) and guest starred in A Country Practice as Christine Agapitos. In 1994 she appeared on the stage at the Sydney Opera House in Caravan.

She relished filming The Sum of Us saying "your best work comes out of a film and you feel that you can really show your talents as an actress". She also compared filming this to when she was on Home and Away:  "You feel like you're really acting and really doing something when you do film because in television you're grinding your way through it.  The moment you finish one script you're on to another one and it just goes on and on and on.  (In film) you have more time to work with it – not at it – and you spend more time talking to the director about the role."

In 1993, she went to the UK for a production of Aladdin. Elmaloglou appeared in Pacific Drive in 1996, as a victim of incest, who dices with death when she turns to drugs. She appeared in an episode of Life Support as a "publicity whore". The actress later posed naked in a Gothic-themed set of photographs for the Australian celebrity nude art magazine Black+White. In a 1995 interview, she stated that she did not receive the offers she had anticipated after leaving Home and Away and that finding work was a struggle.

On 7 February 2013, it was announced that Elmaloglou had joined the cast of Neighbours as Terese Willis, a role she remained in until the show's final episode on 28 July 2022.

References

External links

1974 births
Actresses from Sydney
Australian child actresses
Australian people of English descent
Australian people of Greek descent
Australian soap opera actresses
Dench family
Living people
People with obsessive–compulsive disorder